Stone Barn Castle is located in Cleveland, New York.  Designed by Charles William Knight, the castle was completed in 1906. The castle operated as a functional dairy farm, until it went bankrupt during the Great Depression. A 
fire destroyed much of the castle in 1946.

The castle was rediscovered in 1969 by Dr. William Hugel and his family restored the building and opened it to the public. In 2006, the Hugel family sold the castle, and the structure remains as a private residence for actor Adrien Brody, who bought the castle in 2007.

Stone Barn Castle is no longer open to the public.

External links
 Rome Sentinel article

References

Buildings and structures in Oneida County, New York
Barns in New York (state)